Denise Ilitch (born November 1955) is a Detroit-area businessperson, lawyer, and member of the Board of Regents of the University of Michigan. Ilitch was rumored to be a Democratic Party candidate for Governor of Michigan in 2010, after having met with the White House in early January to discuss a potential run, though she later declined to run.

Background and business experience
Denise Ilitch is a second-generation Macedonian American, the daughter of Mike Ilitch and Marian Ilitch. She earned her bachelor's degree from the University of Michigan in 1977, and her Juris Doctor from the University of Detroit in 1980. After law school, Ilitch was the vice-president of Little Caesar Enterprises from 1981 to 1992, during which time the business moved to downtown Detroit from Farmington Hills, sparking other investment in Detroit. She was later president of Ilitch Holdings, a privately held business that manages the Detroit Tigers, Detroit Red Wings, Little Caesars, the Fox Theatre, and other Detroit-area businesses. She is the owner and publisher of Ambassador magazine, and the owner of Denise Ilitch Designs. Ilitch is also "Of Counsel" at the law firm Clark Hill, where she advises clients in the areas of business practice, corporate law, and government policy. In May 2009, she was named as co-chair of Detroit mayor-elect Dave Bing's transition team.

Community involvement
Ilitch serves on the boards of many business and community organizations in the Detroit area. She is a past member of the board of directors for the Detroit Branch NAACP, the ACLU of Michigan advisory committee, the Detroit Metro Convention and Visitors Bureau, and the board of directors of the Detroit Branch of the Federal Reserve Bank of Chicago. Ilitch founded the Ilitch Charities for Children, and established the Denise Ilitch Scholarship at Walsh College for women to complete advanced degrees.

University of Michigan Board of Regents
On November 5, 2008, Ilitch was elected statewide to an eight-year term on the Board of Regents of the University of Michigan. She made controlling university tuition costs a centerpiece of her campaign. Ilitch was one of only two members of the Board of Regents to vote against a tuition hike in July 2009.

2010 gubernatorial election
After John Cherry dropped out of the campaign for governor of Michigan in January 2010, Ilitch met with senior advisors at the White House, including the President. Ilitch also met with the Democratic Governors Association while in Washington D.C. She announced the following month that she would not enter the race, citing the compressed campaign schedule.

References

External links
Denise Ilitch's bio at Clark Hill
Ilitch's bio at the University of Michigan
Ilitch Charities for Children

Living people
American entertainment industry businesspeople
Lawyers from Detroit
University of Michigan alumni
1955 births
American people of Macedonian descent
Regents of the University of Michigan
Businesspeople from Detroit
Ilitch family